Shap railway station served the village of Shap, Westmorland (now in Cumbria), England for over 120 years.

Operations

The station was situated on the West Coast Main Line and was opened on 17 December 1846, when the section of the Lancaster and Carlisle Railway was opened between Oxenholme (for Kendal) and Carlisle.

Shap station passed into the hands of the London and North Western Railway very soon after opening and that company operated it until amalgamation into the London Midland and Scottish Railway (LMSR) in 1923.  British Railways took over operation on 1 January 1948, but closed the station to passengers on 1 July 1968.

In 1922, five trains for Carlisle called at Shap on weekdays, with a further two local trains to Penrith. A similar service operated southbound.

Notes

References
 
 

Disused railway stations in Cumbria
Railway stations in Great Britain opened in 1846
Railway stations in Great Britain closed in 1968
Beeching closures in England
Former Lancaster and Carlisle Railway stations
Shap